Khulna-4 is a constituency represented in the Jatiya Sangsad (National Parliament) of Bangladesh since 2018 by Abdus Salam Murshedy of the Awami League.

Boundaries 
The constituency encompasses Rupsa and Terokhada upazilas, and all but two union parishads of Dighalia Upazila: Arongghata and Jugipole.

History 
The constituency was created for the first general elections in newly independent Bangladesh, held in 1973.

Ahead of the 2018 general election, the Election Commission reduced the boundaries of the constituency by removing two union parishads of Dighalia Upazila: Ayongghata and Jogipole.

Members of Parliament

Elections

Elections in the 2010s 
Mostafa Rashidi Suja died in July 2018. Abdus Salam Murshedy was elected unopposed on 4 September, as he was the only candidate in the by-election scheduled for later that month.

Mostafa Rashidi Suja was elected unopposed in the 2014 general election after opposition parties withdrew their candidacies in a boycott of the election.

Elections in the 2000s

Elections in the 1990s

References

External links
 

Parliamentary constituencies in Bangladesh
Khulna District